Mohamed Amin Osman is a Somali politician, a member of the Transitional Federal Parliament. He has been described as a critic of the President of Somalia, Sharif Sheikh Ahmed.

References

Living people
Members of the Transitional Federal Parliament
Year of birth missing (living people)
Place of birth missing (living people)
21st-century Somalian politicians